Joseph Cracknell (born 28 September 1994) is an English professional footballer who plays as a goalkeeper for Scarborough Athletic. After playing for Hull City, Scarborough Athletic, Bradford City and Bradford (Park Avenue), he signed for Harrogate Town in August 2017.

Career
Born in Kingston upon Hull, Cracknell played for Hull City at youth level, and had a spell on loan at Scarborough Athletic, before signing for Bradford City in the summer of 2015 following a trial period at the club. Whilst at Bradford City, Cracknell had loan a second loan spell at Scarborough Athletic and later joined Bradford (Park Avenue) on loan, where he made 7 league appearances.

He signed for Harrogate Town in August 2017. He made his professional debut for Harrogate Town on 5 September 2020 in a 1–1 EFL Cup draw with Tranmere Rovers, in which Harrogate won the penalty shoot-out.

He signed for Scarborough Athletic in August 2022.

Career statistics

Honours
Harrogate Town
FA Trophy: 2019–20

References

External links
 
 

1994 births
Living people
English footballers
Footballers from Kingston upon Hull
Association football goalkeepers
Hull City A.F.C. players
Bradford City A.F.C. players
Scarborough Athletic F.C. players
Bradford (Park Avenue) A.F.C. players
Harrogate Town A.F.C. players
National League (English football) players
English Football League players